František Prokop (born 13 September 1914, date of death unknown) is a Czech former sports shooter. He competed in the 300 metre rifle, three positions event at the 1960 Summer Olympics.

References

1914 births
Year of death missing
Czech male sport shooters
Olympic shooters of Czechoslovakia
Shooters at the 1960 Summer Olympics